Melvyn 'Mel' Richard Batty (born 1940), is a male former athlete who competed for England.

Athletics career
He represented England in the 3,000m steeplechase, 6 miles and marathon at the 1962 British Empire and Commonwealth Games in Perth, Western Australia.

He was a member of the Thurrock Harriers Club, and was the British cross country champion.

References

1940 births
English male long-distance runners
Athletes (track and field) at the 1962 British Empire and Commonwealth Games
Living people
Commonwealth Games competitors for England